Vidoje (Cyrillic script: Видоје) is a masculine given name of Slavic origin. It may refer to:

Vidoje Blagojević (born 1950), military commander
Vidoje Žarković (1927–2000), politician

See also
Vidojevica

Slavic masculine given names
Serbian masculine given names